Andrew Zuckerman (born 1977) is an American filmmaker and photographer. He is best known for creating hyper-real images set against stark white backgrounds. His subjects have included birds, endangered species of animals, politicians, humanitarians, artists, and entertainers.

Zuckerman received his BFA from the School of Visual Arts in 1999. He began his career as a commercial still life photographer, before releasing the book, Creature, a portrait series of animals, in 2007. He has since published four additional volumes: Wisdom (2008), Bird (2009), Music (2010), and Flower (2012). Wisdom and Music were also realized as feature length, interview-format documentary films. In 2006, Zuckerman co-founded the company, Late Night and Weekends, through which he released the acclaimed documentary, Still Bill, about the life of Blues musician, Bill Withers, and created campaigns for brands including Puma and Gap. He produced and directed his first short narrative film, High Falls, starring Maggie Gyllenhaal and Peter Sarsgaard, in 2007. It premiered at the Sundance Film Festival and received the award for best short narrative at the Woodstock Film Festival the same year. Writing for The New York Times, David Carr called the project "a pretty film, and a pretty smart film." His photographic and film work has been exhibited in solo and group exhibitions internationally.

Zuckerman's brand work for Apple, Inc. has spanned commercials, launch videos, and special projects, including the book, Designed by Apple in California.

Works, Technique and Exhibitions
Zuckerman has spoken extensively about his interest in systematically collecting and organizing data to create multiple entry points into work that is conceptual in nature. One such system is a comprehensive mobile studio, consisting of fourteen cases of equipment, with which Zuckerman has traveled the world in order to situate all of his subjects in the same space. In addition to photographers including Richard Avedon and Irving Penn, he cites designers like Massimo and Lella Vignelli and Buckminster Fuller as influences, and has said that his minimalist style is "a function of what I was after conceptually with the work I was creating [and] a solution to a series of desires I have for what I want my work to communicate" rather than an aesthetic choice. He has discussed his use of white as a transportational device that allows him to draw out the essential nature of his subjects.

Zuckerman began exploring his signature approach in Creature. By dispensing with the environmental framework of conventional nature photography, the images focus on the form and character of a specific animal in a specific space, rather than its behavior in a habitat or evolutionary purpose. Zuckerman has said that he drew inspiration from the dioramas at the Museum of Natural History and was interested in creating a kind of two-dimensional taxidermy. The book includes a taxonomical index for each of the species photographed. In 2014, works from the Creature series were displayed as a part of the Nevada Museum of Art's Late Harvest exhibit and two were retained for the museum's permanent collection. Private collectors of Zuckerman's work from the series include the architect Bjarke Ingels, Adam Levine and Behati Prinsloo.

Zuckerman applied the same visual language – intimate, close-up portraits against a bright white background – to the Wisdom project, for which he filmed, photographed, and interviewed 60 politicians, artists, entertainers, designers and religious and business leaders over the age of 65, including Chuck Close, Frank Gehry, Judi Dench, Clint Eastwood, Jane Goodall, Desmond Tutu, and Ted Kennedy.

During the making of Wisdom, Zuckerman became interested in the idea of the dynamic portrait, one that incorporates voice, physical presence, and written word. Interviewing subjects around the common themes of love, work, conflict resolution, and the environment, and utilizing a mobile studio, Zuckerman aimed to place his contributors in the same virtual space and conversation, creating what he refers to as a "group of global elders to speak to our global village". The Wisdom traveling exhibit, which premiered at The Library of New South Wales in Sydney, Australia, incorporates text, video, and images from the project, and continues to tour internationally today.

Following the release of Wisdom, Zuckerman began work on Bird. His hyper-detailed photographs of over seventy species nod at John James Audubon's ornithological drawings. In order to capture physical qualities and flight activity rarely visible to the viewer, Zuckerman instituted a variety of techniques, including a custom-built delay system, in which the bird's movement triggered the exposure. In 2012, his image of the Blue Fronted Amazon in flight was included in Florian Heine's Photography: The Groundbreaking Moments. Of Zuckerman's imagery, Heine lauded "the variety and the brilliant colors [which] have never been shown in this way before." The Bird website features a short accompanying film, and incorporates additional data such as wingspan and audio files of each species' call. Both Creature and Bird are informed by a conservationist element, and include portraits of many rare or endangered animals.

Music, was released as a book, film, and iPad application in 2010, and features portraits of and interviews with musicians from disparate genres, including Lenny Kravitz, Ozzy Osbourne, Herbie Hancock, and Philip Glass. Following the footprint he laid out in Wisdom, Zuckerman touched upon similar themes in interviews with each of his contributors, and the documentary intersects footage of the artists as they discuss performance, collaboration, inspiration, and success.

Returning to his visual survey of the natural world with his 2012 project, Flower, Zuckerman photographed over 230 varieties of flora, drawing inspiration from 19th century botanical drawings. He has expressed his desire to create, with the use of modern technology, "the best possible two-dimensional representation of three-dimensional living things", and to separate his subject from its metaphorical associations in art.  Like Creature and Bird, Flower includes a taxonomical index. The project, which filmmaker David Lynch has called "a grand celebration of mother nature's artistry" 
, also incorporates time lapse films of the life cycles of seven different species. The films were created from high definition stills, as opposed to video footage. The 2013 Flowers and Mushrooms show at the Museum de Moderne in Salzburg included four works from the Flower series, along with work by Andy Warhol, David LaChapelle, and Peter Fischli and David Weiss. Zuckerman's flowers were also exhibited at the Museum Schloss Moyland. Zuckerman later  developed a line of wallpapers from the photographs, which were acquired for the permanent collections of the Cooper Hewitt Design Museum and the Smithsonian.

Zuckerman has expressed his interest in exploring singular subjects from a multitude of perspectives and engaging his audience across a variety of platforms. In 2016, he engaged in a year-long curation of design objects that reflected the intersection of man and nature at Chamber Gallery in New York.

In 2022, Zuckerman won a Clio award for his photographic collaboration with UNDP and the Lions Share Fund for the Eye to Eye campaign, aimed at catalyzing a movement to preserve global biodiversity.

Commercial Work 
Zuckerman's brand work has included projects for Puma, BMW, Gap, Gucci, and Tiffany & Co. He collaborated with Apple on product launches and other media, including the book Designed by Apple in California, which collected over 200 of Zuckerman's images of Apple products, from the first iMac through the Apple Watch. According to the 2022 book After Steve, Zuckerman's "work resonated with [Jony] Ive and [Steve] Jobs because he shared their obsessions with perfectionism and minimalism."

Media Company 
In 2018, Zuckerman launched The Slowdown, a media company he founded with former Surface editor-in-chief Spencer Bailey that "seeks to engage with nature while thinking about our society's relationship to time." The Slowdown produces the podcasts Time Sensitive and  At a Distance. Interviews from the latter have been collected and condensed in book form.

Books
Creature (2007)
Wisdom (2008)
Bird (2009)
Music (2010)
"Flower" (2012)
Designed by Apple in California (2016)

Films
High Falls (2007), Director, Producer
Wisdom (2008), Director, Producer, Executive Producer
"Bird" (2009), Director, Producer
Still BIll (2009), Executive Producer
Music (2010), Director, Producer, Executive Producer
"Flower" (2012), Director, Producer

Solo exhibitions
2007
Creature, Forma International Center of Photography, Milan, Italy

2008
Wisdom, State Library of New South Wales, Sydney, Australia

2009
Bird Film, High Line, New York City, NY
Bird, Colette, Paris, France

2010
Bird Film, Institute of Contemporary Art, Boston, MA
Bird Film, International Film Festival Breda, Breda, The Netherlands
Wisdom Exhibit, World Financial Center, Winter Garden, New York City, NY
Wisdom Exhibit, Siamsa Tire Gallery, Dingle, Ireland

2011
Wisdom, Bank of America Plaza, Los Angeles, CA
Wisdom, Brookfield Place Adam Lambert Galleria, Toronto, CA
Wisdom, Bay Adelaide Center, Toronto, CA

Selected group exhibitions
1999
SVA mentor show

2003
Young Guns Show

2007
SUNY ULSTER
Muroff Kotler Gallery, Stone Ridge New York, USA

2008
Paris Photo, Carrousel du Louvre, Paris, France

2011
Obstacle, Invisible Dog Gallery, Brooklyn, NY, USA
Getxphoto Festival, Bilbao, Spain

2013
Flowers and Mushrooms
Museum der Moderne, Salzburg, Austria

2014
Late Harvest, Nevada Museum of Art, Reno, NV, USA

2016
Say It with Flowers, Museum Schloss Moyland, Bedburg-Hau, Germany

Honors and awards
2003
Art Directors Club, Young Guns

2005
Broadcast Design Award

2006
D&AD Yellow Pencil For Photography

2007
High Falls, Woodstock Film Festival, Best Short Film
High Falls, Sundance Film Festival, Official Selection"

Annuals
2003
American Photography Annual
Communication Arts Annual

2005
Communication Arts Photography Annual
PDN Photography Annual
PDN 30

2006
Communication Arts Annual
PDN Photography Annual

2007
PDN Digital_Personal
PDN Digital_Music
Graphis Advertising Annual
Graphis Photography Annual
PDN Photography Annual

2008
Communication Arts Annual
PDN Photo Annual
Graphis Photography Annual

2009
American Photography 25
Communication Arts Annual

2010
Graphis Photography Annual
American Photography 26
PDN Photo Annual
Communication Arts
D&AD Annual

2011
Graphis Photography Annual, 100 Best in Photography

External references

References

External links
andrewzuckerman.com
creaturebook.com
wisdombook.org
Bird
Music
latenightandweekends.com

Interview with Andrew Zuckerman

Video links
Creature Behind the Scenes
Wisdom Trailer
Wisdom Behind the Scenes
Bird Film
Bird Behind the Scenes
Music Trailer
Music Making of Footage
Andrew Zuckerman on Ellen
Creative Mornings Talk
Zuckerman on Carson Daly
Zuckerman at the 2011 99% Conference

20th-century American Jews
1977 births
Living people
American photographers
School of Visual Arts alumni
21st-century American Jews